In the physical chemistry study of polymers, the end-to-end vector is the vector that points from one end of a polymer to the other end. 

If each monomer unit in a polymer is represented by a point in space, the translation vectors  connect between these points. The end-to-end vector  is the sum of these translation vectors:

The norm of the end-to-end vector is called the end-to-end distance.

Relation to other quantities

The quadratic mean of the end-to-end distance  can be related to the quadratic mean of the radius of gyration  of a polymer by the relation:

Notes

See also
 Freely Jointed Chain
 Worm-like chain

Polymers
Polymer physics